Jean-François Dubos (born 2 September 1945) is a former French businessman who was chairman of the management board of the multinational media conglomerate Vivendi.

Biography

Education
Jean-François Dubos has a degree in English and Spanish and holds a graduate degree in public international law and political science from the University of Paris.

Career
From 1981 to 1984, he was co-head of the cabinet of the French Ministry of Defense, under Charles Hernu. From 1984 to 1991, he was a member of the French Administrative Supreme Court (Conseil d’État). Jean-François Dubos joined Compagnie Générale des Eaux, the predecessor of Vivendi, as deputy to the chief executive officer in 1991, and since 1994, has held the position of General Counsel. He was appointed Chairman of the management board of Vivendi at a supervisory board meeting held on June 28, 2012.

Head of Vivendi
Since his appointment as Vivendi chairman, Jean-François Dubos has operated a reorientation of the group's strategy toward Media and Telecommunications.

According to him, "the future of Vivendi is to be found in content and content distribution". He believes Vivendi will become these sectors' European leaders.

During the June 24, 2014 Annual Shareholders Meeting, he became the Honorary Chairman of the company.

Notes and references

1945 births
Living people
French businesspeople
University of Paris alumni